The London Journal; and Weekly Record of Literature, Science and Art (published from 1845 to 1928) was a British penny fiction weekly, one of the best-selling magazines of the nineteenth century.

It was established by George Stiff, published by George Vickers and initially written and edited by George W. M. Reynolds. After Reynolds left to found his own Reynolds's Miscellany in 1846, John Wilson Ross became editor. 

In the mid-1850s the magazine's circulation was over 500,000.

Herbert Ingram, in secret partnership with Punchs owners Bradbury and Evans, bought the magazine in 1857, and Punchs editor Mark Lemon was placed in editorial charge. Lemon's attempt to rebrand the magazine, serializing novels by Walter Scott, was a commercial failure. George Stiff bought back the paper in 1859 (combining it with a title, The Guide, which he had started in the interim) and installed Percy B. St. John and then Pierce Egan as editor. After Stiff's bankruptcy in 1862, W. S. Johnson became proprietor.

By 1883 it had transformed itself from being a 'penny family weekly' into what was recognizably a 'woman’s magazine'. Herbert Allingham became editor in 1889, publishing his own story "A Devil of a Woman" in 1893.

Contributors 
Contributors to the magazine included leading authors of the day, such as Mary Elizabeth Braddon (Lady Audley's Secret and The Outcast), E. D. E. N. Southworth (The Gypsy’s Prophecy), and Pierce Egan (The Poor Girl). However, it was "Minnigrey" by the less well-known John Frederick Smith that made this weekly achieve hitherto unprecedented sales of 500,000 a week.

Artists George Frederick Sargent, John Proctor and (even more significantly) John Gilbert contributed to engravings in The London Journal.

Notes

References
Anderson, Patricia, The Printed Image and the Transformation of Popular Culture, 1790-1860. New York: Clarendon Press. 1992. 
Andrew King, 'A Paradigm of Reading the Victorian Penny Weekly: Education of the Gaze and The London Journal'''. In Brake et al., eds, Nineteenth-Century Media and the Construction of Identities, 2000, pp. 77-92.

Works of George Frederick Sargent (although not those that appeared in The London Journal'') can be found at http://collage.cityoflondon.gov.uk.

1845 establishments in the United Kingdom
1928 disestablishments in the United Kingdom
Weekly magazines published in the United Kingdom
Defunct literary magazines published in the United Kingdom
Magazines established in 1845
Magazines disestablished in 1928
Magazines published in London